Coyotepec Popoloca is an indigenous language of the Mexican state of Puebla. It is spoken in the municipality of Coyotepec. The dialect of the town of San Mateo is counted as Coyotepec, but it may be a distinct language, or a dialect of San Felipe Otlaltepec (Western Popoloca). Coyotepec proper and Western Popoloca are about 40% mutually intelligible.

References

Popolocan languages